Janette Atkinson,  is a British psychologist and academic, specialising in the human development of vision and visual cognition. She was Professor of Psychology at University College London from 1993: she is now emeritus professor. She was also co-director of the Visual Development Unit at the Department of Psychology, University College London and the Department of Experimental Psychology, University of Oxford. She frequently  collaborated with her husband Oliver Braddick.

Early life and education
Atkinson studied psychology at the University of Bristol, graduating with a Bachelor of Science (BSc) degree in 1965. She went on to undertake postgraduate studies at the University of Cambridge, and she completed her Doctor of Philosophy (PhD) degree in 1970. Her doctoral thesis was titled "A study of perceptual analysis using stabilized images".

Academic career
From 1971 to 1972, Atkinson was research associate with the Institute for Behavioral Genetics at the University of Colorado Boulder. In 1972, she was a research associate in the Department of Psychology of Johns Hopkins University, Maryland. She then returned to the University of Cambridge where she was a Senior Research Associate from 1972 to 1983. During this time, she established the Visual Development Unit at the University of Cambridge. From 1983 to 1993, she was classified as MRC External Scientific Staff of the Department of Experimental Psychology, Cambridge.

In 1993, Atkinson moved to University College London (UCL) where she had been appointed Professor of Psychology. The Visual Development Unit moved with her from Cambridge. A second Visual Development Unit was created at the University of Oxford in 2003. She was Co-Director of both units with her husband Oliver Braddick. Having retired from full-time academia, she was appointed Emeritus Professor by UCL.

Personal life
In 1979, Atkinson married Oliver Braddick, a fellow developmental psychologist; he died in 2022. They have four children: two sons and two daughters.

Honours
In 2002, Atkinson was elected a Fellow of the Academy of Medical Sciences (FMedSci). In 2008, she was elected a Member of Academia Europaea. In 2009, she, along with Oliver Braddick, won the Kurt Koffka Medal. In 2015, she was elected a Fellow of the British Academy (FBA), the United Kingdom's national academy for the humanities and social sciences. In 2016, she was awarded the Davida Teller Award by the Vision Sciences Society.

Selected works

References

Living people
Year of birth missing (living people)
British psychologists
British women psychologists
Cognitive psychologists
Developmental psychologists
Psychology educators
Academics of the University of Oxford
Fellows of the British Academy
Fellows of the Academy of Medical Sciences (United Kingdom)
Members of Academia Europaea
Alumni of the University of Bristol
Alumni of the University of Cambridge
University of Colorado Boulder faculty
Johns Hopkins University faculty
Vision scientists
Women vision scientists